Jason Daniel Borgas (born 3 September 1981) is an Australian cricketer. He played six first-class matches for South Australia in 2007.

References

External links
 

1981 births
Living people
Australian cricketers
South Australia cricketers
Place of birth missing (living people)